"Million to One" is a song by Cuban–American singer Camila Cabello from the 2021 soundtrack Cinderella. The song was written by Cabello, Scott Harris and produced by the latter. It was released on July 21, 2021, through Epic Records, as the first promotional single from the soundtrack.

Background and promotion
In April 2019 it was announced that Camila Cabello was working on the soundtrack for the film Cinderella. In October 2020, Idina Menzel confirmed that "[she and Camila] both have original songs as well." In June 2021, a snippet of the song was featured in the teaser trailer of the film, when the music director of the film Keith Harrison teased the title of the song. On July 28, 2021 a demo version of the song which was recorded in 2019 was leaked on the internet. On August 27, 2021, a snippet of the pop remix was released on TikTok. The pop remix was officially released on September 3, 2021, along with the deluxe edition of the soundtrack.

Music video
The music video for the original song, directed by Kay Cannon, premiered on August 31, 2021, on Cinderellas official Vevo channel.

Track listings

Credits and personnel
Credits adapted from Tidal.
 Camila Cabello – vocals, songwriting
 Scott Harris – songwriting, production
 Anne Preven – miscellaneous production
 Matt Rad – miscellaneous production
 Tony Maserati – mixing
 Bart Schoudel – vocal production
 Dave Kutch – mastering

Charts

Reprises

"Million to One (Reprise)" and "Million to One / Could Have Been Me (Reprise)" are the reprises of the song "Million to One" from Cinderella. The first reprise like the original is sung by Camila Cabello but the second reprise is a mashup containing Cinderella co-star Nicholas Galitzine singing "Could Have Been Me" by the Struts.

Credits and personnel
Credits adapted from Tidal.

 Camila Cabello – vocals, songwriting
 Nicholas Galitzine – vocals
 Kay Cannon – arrangement
 Keith Harrison – arrangement
 Anne Preven – production
 David Campbell – orchestra
 Scott Harris – songwriting
 Matt Rad – miscellaneous production
 Tony Maserati – mixing
 Dave Kutch – mastering

Release history

References

2021 songs
Camila Cabello songs
Songs written by Camila Cabello
Songs written by Scott Harris (songwriter)